The 2022-23 Azadi March II is a protest march sequel of the 2022 Azadi March I led by the former Prime Minister of Pakistan Imran Khan from Lahore to Islamabad against the Shehbaz Sharif ministry's refusal to announce early general elections and the appointment of a new Pakistan Army Chief.

Imran ultimately announced on 25 October 2022, that the long march will begin on 28 October, from Liberty Chowk, Lahore, and will end in Islamabad before turning into a sit-in.

March stop points
Shahdara Bagh (Lahore) 29 October 2022
Muridke 30 October 2022
Kamoke 31 October 2022
Gujranwala 1–2 November 2022
Wazirabad 3 November 2022
Gujrat 
Lala Musa 
Kharian 
Jhelum 
Dina  
Sohawa 
Gujar Khan 
Rawalpindi 26 November 2022
Islamabad

Incidents

Sadaf Naeem death
On 30 October 2022, Sadaf Naeem, a journalist for a Pakistani news TV channel died in an accident while trying to cover the march in close proximity. She tried to climb Khan's truck and lost her balance, fell on the ground, and was run-over by the truck. She was rushed to the hospital but was pronounced dead on arrival.

On her death, Pakistan Tehreek-e-Insaf's leadership expressed shock and grief. Imran Khan announced a stop to his Azadi March for the day. He also visited her residence in order to offer condolences to her family.

Shooting of Imran Khan

Assassination attempt
On 3 November, while giving a speech to his supporters, shots were fired by unidentified gunmen at Khan's container-mounted-truck. According to an aide of Khan, the truck was fired at six times. A Khan supporter by the name of Ibtisam tried to tackle the gunman. One other supporter was shot dead attempting to tackle the shooter. A burst of gunfire happened first, then, moments later, a single pistol fire sound.

Khan was shot in the shin and thigh on the right leg and was transferred to Shaukat Khanum Memorial Cancer Hospital and Research Centre in Lahore, where he underwent treatment. His doctor, Faisal Sultan, said that X-rays and scans showed bullet fragments lodged in Khan's legs, and that his tibia was fractured. A leader of the PTI said that his condition was stable. He was then discharged from the hospital on the 6th of November.

In total, nine people were injured, including Imran Khan and Senator Faisal Javed Khan, and one person was killed.

References

2022 protests
2022 in Pakistani politics
October 2022 events in Pakistan
November 2022 events in Pakistan
Protest marches
Protests in Pakistan
Pakistan Tehreek-e-Insaf
Imran Khan